Budots is a grassroots electronic dance music (EDM) genre that originated in Davao City, Philippines, and is considered as street style hiphop. It eventually spread in Bisaya-speaking regions. Based on house music and indigenous Badjao beats, it is regarded as the first "Filipino-fied" electronic music, characterized by its heavy use of percussion, hypnotic bass, high-pitched "tiw ti-ti-tiw" whistle hooks, and organic noises that surround the city. It is created to complement a form of freestyle street dance that bears the same name.

Origins 

Budots is a Bisaya slang word for slacker (Tagalog: tambay). An undergraduate thesis published in University of the Philippines Mindanao suggests the slang originated from the Bisaya word burot meaning "to inflate," a euphemism to the glue-sniffing juvenile delinquents called "rugby boys." The publication also claims that rugby boys dance in a style that would be called budots to disguise their drug use. It can also be traced from the Bisaya word tabudots, which means "a person dancing with unpredictable movements."

Budots dance has eventually made its way to unemployed bums who loiter Davao City. The style seems "worm-like" or "ragdoll-like" in nature, wriggling the hips while moving the arms and legs in slow movements. One of its characteristic moves features opening and closing the knees while in a low squat, the arms swaying and pointing at random. Despite its freestyle movements, the poses in budots dance are possibly inspired by the Badjao people who perform as street buskers, either through variations of the traditional Pangalay dance or their indigenous martial arts such as Kuntaw and Langka Baruwang. Writer and musician Dominic Zinampan claims the connection between budots and the Badjao people remains inconclusive, as it is hard to tell which influenced the other.

Budots dance was used to be performed with foreign electronic dance music until Sherwin Calumpang Tuna, an internet café manager who goes by the stage name "DJ Love" or "Lablab," created a new techno music genre that would complement the dance using Fruity Loops, which locals referred to as "bistik" (short for Bisayang Tikno, "Visayan techno"). He also choreographed dance steps for his friends to perform on his budots music videos, which were uploaded on his YouTube channel since February 3, 2009. According to Vice, the budots dance compilation videos features "Myspace-era graphics, free-wheeling dances, and the names 'CamusBoyz' or 'DJ Love.'"

While local impression about budots is through its association with overt sexuality, gang wars, and juvenile delinquency, DJ Love has distanced himself and his budots mixes from such issues that plague Davao City.  His music videos are incorporated with captions such as, "Yes to Dance; No to Drugs" or "Yes to Dance; No to Riots." The genre–and its creators–have also become at the receiving end of cyberbullying.

Characteristics 

Budots music is characterized as a derivation from electronic and house music. It features 140 bpm four-on-the-floor patterns, pulsating basslines, multiple percussion layers, distorted and repetitive vocal samples, DJ fills placed throughout the track and distinct high-pitched synth hooks that locals onomatopoetically refer to as tiw tiw. It also bears similarities with Eurodance, but without the melodramatic vocals, over-the-top piano melodies, and expressions of emotional vulnerability in exchange for lewd jokes and calls for rowdy partying. Most budots tracks do not have the usual elements that make a pop song such as verses, choruses, and chord progressions. Instead, the energetic beats are held together with cheesy sound effects such as vinyl scratches or chipmunk laughter. Meanwhile, the budots tracks that do contain lyrics are written in any of the Bisayan languages.

Unlike most dance music that is commonly played in nightclubs, budots is performed outdoors such as basketball courts. It also has an element of virality, as its distinct repetitive sound and the craziness of its dance moves serve as the background of a number of Filipino internet memes such as Hala Mahulog! ("Oh no, it's about to fall!") videos and Taga-asa Ka/ Tagasaan Ka ("Where are you from?") challenge.

Music journalists in the Philippines have criticized budots music for its lack of form, repetitiveness, DIY quality, and "cheap-sounding" effects. In contrast, they also acknowledge how the people of Davao City have reinterpreted a Western music genre and have remolded it to their own liking, as well as the flexibility of budots music in keeping itself relevant by remixing any popular song at the moment.

Depictions in popular culture 
Budots first appeared in Philippine mainstream media in 2008 when Ruben Gonzaga, the winner of Pinoy Big Brother: Celebrity Edition 2, performed the dance steps on national TV. An episode of GMA Network's news magazine program Kapuso Mo, Jessica Soho featured a segment about budots in 2012. In an effort to explain a regional subculture to a Metro Manila-based TV audience, host Jessica Soho called the budots dance as the Philippines' counterpart to other dance crazes at the time such as the dougie in the United States and the "horse dance" in Gangnam Style by Psy of South Korea, describing it as "seemingly freestyle like the pandanggo." She also said that in some instances, the performers did the "spageti dance" that was popularized by SexBomb Girls, but they spent much of the time grinding while in a squatting position that it was deemed vulgar by people who were unfamiliar with the genre.

BuwanBuwan, a Filipino electronic music collective, released a playlist of budots music in 2017 as part of their monthly challenge to their producers. Each track featured excerpts from speeches of Philippine president Rodrigo Duterte, a resident of Davao City. London-based collective and label Eastern Margins released a compilation album titled "Redline Legends," which features reinterpretations of East and Southeast Asian dance music genres such as budots, Vietnam's vinahouse, and Indonesia's funkot.

D'Squared Cru, a street dance group from Davao City, won second place in VIBE PH Dance Competition in 2018 after performing a routine that featured budots tracks namely Budotz by Q-York, Asukarap, and Kiat Jud Dai. Their choreography to the Kiat Jud Dai segment became viral in China after multiple content creators on TikTok and other social media replicated the dance steps, which they referred to as the "electric pendulum dance" (电摆舞, diàn bǎi wǔ). Chinese celebrity Wang Yibo danced to Kiat Jud Dai in an episode of Upward Everyday variety show on Hunan Television.

D'Squared Cru participated in the first season of World of Dance Philippines in 2019, also performing to budots, but failed to pass the Qualifiers. The group then flew to China that same year to participate in Shenzhen Satellite TV's Dance In Step. Their Round 1 performance featured their viral budots choreography, which impressed all three judges.

The documentary Budots: The Craze by Jay Rosas and Mark Paul Limbaga explored the music genre and its dance style, featuring an interview with DJ Love. According to Sun Star of Davao City, the film "raises questions on creative gatekeeping and the extent of ownership", as DJ Love's music was played on Filipino TV networks without proper acknowledgment and compensation. He also alleged a YouTuber claimed ownership of his popular mixes. The documentary premiered in 2019 at the Cinemalaya Philippine Independent Film Festival and was nominated for Best Documentary at the 43rd Gawad Urian Award.

A restaurant in Cagayan de Oro had its waitstaff dance to budots once the disco lights were turned on. An advertisement for Lucky Me! Pancit Canton in 2019 used budots as a mnemonic device for its "No Drain Cooking" method. YouTube-based music parody group Siivagunner, known for their bait-and-switch mashups and remixes of video game sound tracks, incorporated budots in several videos.

Budots remixes of popular songs have become mainstays in Philippine festivals, local radio stations, and Christmas parties. It has also become a form of "uncool" yet non-derogatory self-expression.

Usage in Philippine politics 

During his term as mayor of Davao City, Duterte was seen dancing to budots on two occasions in 2015. One video featured Duterte dancing with Cebuano-speaking Americans from Hey Joe Show! YouTube channel, while the other clip showed him dancing with local teenagers at a public park. The virality of these videos may have helped him win the 2016 presidential elections. A discourse published in University of the Philippines Diliman claims that budots has become instrumental in cementing Duterte's populist posturing as a politician for the masses who is allegedly deeply immersed in Visayan culture. The captions found in DJ Love's budots dance videos, such as "Yes to Dance/ No to Drugs," can be read as support for Duterte's hardline stance on the criminalization of drug abuse.

A number of Filipino politicians have also attempted to use budots to attract voters, most notably by Ramon Bong Revilla Jr., who ran for senator in 2019. He appeared on a national television advertisement dancing to budots music, which critics cited how he did not talk about any plan of governance throughout the campaign. Revilla won the 11th vacant Senate seat (out of 12), even doing a little dance after the official proclamation. DJ Love claimed that Revilla used his track without permission and asked for compensation to Camus Girls, the dance group who popularized the choreography.

Revilla's political advertisement was listed as one of the best Filipino internet memes in 2019. In his column for the Daily Tribune, Larry Faraon wrote that Revilla's victory solely by dancing to budots is a reflection of the culture of elections in the Philippines. Meanwhile, Senator Panfilo Lacson laments the "pathetic" situation of Filipino voters who are easily swayed by stage performances of election candidates, such as cracking jokes and dancing to budots.

Then-Davao City Mayor Sara Duterte-Carpio (daughter of President Duterte) questioned the use of the 1976 song Manila by Hotdog during the parade of Team Philippines at the 2019 Southeast Asian Games opening ceremony. She claimed the title is capital-centric and did not represent the whole country, even suggesting to use budots instead since her fellow Davaoeños "invented" it.

References

External links  
 Badjao buskers performing a precursor to budots music and dance
 An explainer on Pangalay, a classical dance in Sulu archipelago and a possible precursor to budots dance
 A budots dance competition in Masbate Province
 An impromptu budots dance showdown at a high school in Bohol Province
 DJ Love's YouTube channel
 Bakunawa Vol. 7: Rodrigo Duterte's Summer Budots Party (a budots playlist by BuwanBuwan)
 Ramon Bong Revilla Jr's Budots Political Advertisement

2009 in Philippine music
2009 introductions
Culture of Davao City
Electronic dance music genres
Novelty and fad dances
Philippine styles of music